Tomi Rantamäki (born 18 September 1968) is a Finnish curler. He competed in the 2018 Winter Olympics in the mixed doubles competition. He and partner Oona Kauste placed 7th. He has served as the coach of the Chinese Mixed Doubles Curling team since 2021.

Career

Athlete 
Finished seventh in the mixed doubles at the PyeongChang 2018 Winter Olympic. Four consecutive World Mixed Doubles Championship appearances (2016–19), finishing a career-best seventh in his first two championships. Competed four European Championships from 1992 to 2013.

Coach 
Led the Finnish men to a fourth-place finish at the 2015 World Championship.

Finished ninth with the Chinese women's team at the 2021 World Mixed Doubles Championship.

Led the Chinese Mixed Doubles team to the ninth place finish at the 2022 Winter Olympic.

References

External links

1968 births
Living people
Curlers at the 2018 Winter Olympics
Finnish male curlers
Olympic curlers of Finland
21st-century Finnish people